National Night is a commercial by Perfetti Van Melle, the makers of Mentos to encourage procreation on the night of National Day of Singapore in 2012 to express patriotism.

References

External links

Demographics of Singapore
Advertisements
2012 works